Almeidella is a genus of moths in the family Saturniidae first described by Oiticica in 1946.

Species
Almeidella almeidai Oiticica, 1946
Almeidella approximans (Schaus, 1920)
Almeidella corrupta (Schaus, 1913)

References

Ceratocampinae